Among the recipients of the honorary citizenship of the City of Split, Croatia are:

Honorary Citizens of City of Split

References

Honorary citizens of Split
Split